Poullain  is a French surname. Notable people with the surname include:

Fabrice Poullain, French footballer
François Poullain de la Barre
Frankie Poullain (born 1967), bass player
Germain-François Poullain de Saint-Foix, French writer and playwright

French-language surnames